Francisco Alex do Nascimento Moraes or simply Alex (born 19 May 1990), is a Brazilian footballer.

Club career
Alex started his career in 2007 on Palmeiras's youth squad. He was loaned to Taboao da Serra in 2008. On December 17, 2009, he signed for Nanchang Bayi. He scored his goal for Nanchang on 23 April, in a 2–1 away against Changchun Yatai.

References

External links
 profile on ogol.com.br

1990 births
Living people
Brazilian footballers
Brazilian expatriate footballers
Sociedade Esportiva Palmeiras players
Grêmio Barueri Futebol players
Expatriate footballers in China
Chinese Super League players
Shanghai Shenxin F.C. players
Brazilian expatriate sportspeople in China
Association football forwards